The men's team pursuit competition of the cycling events at the 2011 Pan American Games will be held on October 17 at the Pan American Velodrome in Guadalajara. The defending Pan American Games champion is Enzo Cesario, Marco Arriagada, Luis Sepúlveda and Gonzalo Miranda of Chile.

Schedule
All times are Central Standard Time (UTC−6).

Results
8 teams of four competitors competed. The top two teams will race for gold, while third and fourth race for the bronze medals.

Qualification

Finals

References

Track cycling at the 2011 Pan American Games
Men's team pursuit (track cycling)